{{Infobox person
| name         = Bahram Tavakoli
| image        = Bahram Tavakoli.jpg
| caption      = 
| imagesize    = 
| birth_date   = 
| birth_place  = Hamedan, Iran
| occupation   = Film director,screenwriter
| alma_mater   = 
| years_active = 1997–present
| spouse       = 
| children     = 
| notable_works= Here Without Me I am Diego Maradona The Lost Strait
}}
Bahram Tavakoli (born 1976) is an Iranian film director and screenwriter. He won a Crystal Simorgh award for his debut film Barefoot in Heaven'' (2007). Since then, he has released several films that have met with critical acclaim.

Filmography

Film

Home Video

Television Series

References

External links

Iranian film directors
1976 births
Living people
Crystal Simorgh for Best Director winners